Juris Dalbiņš (born January 1, 1954 in Dobele) is a Latvian politician and a Deputy of the Saeima. He is a member of the People's Party.

References

1954 births
Living people
People from Dobele
People's Party (Latvia) politicians
Deputies of the 7th Saeima
Deputies of the 8th Saeima
Deputies of the 9th Saeima